This article contains information about the literary events and publications of 1566.

Events
September 2 – The stage collapses during a performance of Richard Edwardes' play Palamon and Arcite at Oxford, in the presence of Queen Elizabeth I of England. Three deaths are caused. The show goes on and "the Queen laughed heartily thereat."
Ordonnance of Moulins in France prohibits writing, printing or selling of defamatory books and requires all books published to carry a seal of state approval.

New books

Prose
 Historia Caroli Magni (12th century forged chronicle – first printing, at Frankfurt)
 Magdeburg Centuries, volume IX
 François de Belleforest (translated from Matteo Bandello) – Histoires tragiques begins publication)
 Diego de Landa – Relación de las cosas de Yucatán
 William Painter – Palace of Pleasure
 The Flower Triod (Триод Цветни)

Drama
 George Gascoigne – Supposes (translation into English prose from Ludovico Ariosto's I suppositi, for performance by gentlemen of Gray's Inn in London)
(with Francis Kinwelmersh) – Jocasta (translation from Lodovico Dolce's Giocasta, a version of Euripides' The Phoenician Women, for performance by gentlemen of Gray's Inn)
Gismund of Salerne (written and produced for Queen Elizabeth I of England by the gentlemen of Inner Temple in London)

Poetry
See 1566 in poetry

Births
September 1 – Edward Alleyn, English actor (died 1626)
Unknown date – John Hoskins, English poet (died 1638)

Deaths
January 6 – Jan Utenhove, Flemish translator (born 1516)
March – António de Gouveia, Portuguese legal writer and humanist (born c. 1505)
April 25 – Louise Labé, French poet (born c. 1524)
July 13 – Thomas Hoby, English translator (born 1530)
October 10 – Hentenius, Flemish biblical commentator (born 1499)
October 31 – Richard Edwardes, English poet and dramatist (born 1525)
unknown date – Alexius Pedemontanus, Italian physician and alchemist, author of a "book of secrets" (born c. 1500)

References

Years of the 16th century in literature